Jean-Baptiste René (August 22, 1841 – April 6, 1916) was the second Roman Catholic Prefect Apostolic of Alaska.

Born in France, Rene was ordained in 1876. On March 16, 1897, Father Rene was appointed prefect apostolic of Alaska resigning on March 28, 1904. He was later Professor of Scripture and of Hebrew at Spokane.

Notes

Christian missionaries in Alaska
Apostolic prefects of Alaska
French Jesuits
1841 births
1916 deaths
French Roman Catholic missionaries
20th-century American Roman Catholic priests
Jesuit missionaries in the United States
French expatriates in the United States
Jesuit missionaries
19th-century American Roman Catholic priests